Croke Park is a Gaelic games stadium in Dublin, Ireland. Named after Archbishop Thomas Croke, it is referred to as Croker by GAA fans and locals. It serves as both the principal national stadium of Ireland and headquarters of the Gaelic Athletic Association (GAA). Since 1891 the site has been used by the GAA to host Gaelic sports, including the annual All-Ireland in Gaelic football and hurling.

A major expansion and redevelopment of the stadium ran from 1991 to 2005, raising capacity to its current 82,300 spectators. This makes Croke Park the third-largest stadium in Europe, and the largest not usually used for association football in Europe.

Other events held at the stadium include the opening and closing ceremonies of the 2003 Special Olympics, and numerous musical concerts. In 2012, Irish pop group Westlife sold out the stadium in record-breaking time: less than 5 minutes. From 2007 to 2010, Croke Park hosted home matches of the Ireland national rugby union team and the Republic of Ireland national football team, while their new Aviva Stadium was constructed. This use of Croke Park for non-Gaelic sports was controversial and required temporary changes to GAA rules. In June 2012, the stadium hosted the closing ceremony of the 50th International Eucharistic Congress during which Pope Benedict XVI gave an address over video link.

City and Suburban Racecourse

The area now known as Croke Park was owned in the 1880s by Maurice Butterly and known as the City and Suburban Racecourse, or Jones' Road sports ground. From 1890 it was also used by the Bohemian Football Club. In 1901 Jones' Road hosted the IFA Cup football final when Cliftonville defeated Freebooters.

History
Recognising the potential of the Jones' Road sports ground a journalist and GAA member, Frank Dineen, borrowed much of the £3,250 asking price and bought the ground in 1908. In 1913 the GAA came into exclusive ownership of the plot when they purchased it from Dineen for £3,500. The ground was then renamed Croke Park in honour of Archbishop Thomas Croke, one of the GAA's first patrons.

In 1913, Croke Park had only two stands on what is now known as the Hogan stand side and grassy banks all round. In 1917, a grassy hill was constructed on the railway end of Croke Park to afford patrons a better view of the pitch. This terrace was known originally as Hill 60, later renamed Hill 16 in memory of the 1916 Easter Rising. It is erroneously believed to have been built from the ruins of the GPO, when it was constructed the previous year in 1915.

In 1918, the GAA set out to create a high capacity stadium at Croke Park. Following the Hogan Stand, the Cusack Stand, named after Michael Cusack from Clare (who founded the GAA and served as its first secretary), was built in 1927. 1936 saw the first double-deck Cusack Stand open with 5000 seats, and concrete terracing being constructed on Hill 16. In 1952 the Nally Stand was built in memorial of Pat Nally, another of the GAA founders. Seven years later, to celebrate the 75th anniversary of the GAA, the first cantilevered "New Hogan Stand" was opened.

The highest attendance ever recorded at an All-Ireland Senior Football Championship Final was 90,556 for Offaly v Down in 1961. Since the introduction of seating to the Cusack stand in 1966, the largest crowd recorded has been 84,516.

Bloody Sunday

On 21 November 1920, during the Irish War of Independence, Croke Park was the scene of a massacre perpetrated by the Auxiliary Division of the Royal Irish Constabulary (RIC). The RIC entered the ground and began shooting into the crowd, killing or fatally wounding 14 civilians during a Dublin-Tipperary Gaelic football match. The dead included 13 spectators and Tipperary player Michael Hogan. Posthumously, the Hogan stand, built in 1924, was named in his honour. Those shootings, on the day which became known as Bloody Sunday, were a reprisal for the killing of 15 people associated with the Cairo Gang, a group of British intelligence officers, by Michael Collins' "Squad" earlier that day.

Dublin Rodeo
In 1924, American rodeo promoter, Tex Austin, staged the Dublin Rodeo, Ireland's first professional rodeo at Croke Park Stadium.  For seven days, with two shows each day from August 18 to August 24, sell out crowds saw cowboys and cowgirls from Canada, the United States, Mexico, Argentina and Australia compete for rodeo championship titles.  Canadian bronc riders such as Andy Lund and his brother Art Lund, trick riders such as Ted Elder and Vera McGinnis were among the contestants.  British Pathe filmed some of the rodeo events.

Stadium redesign
In  1984 the organisation decided to investigate ways to increase the capacity of the old stadium. The design for an 80,000 capacity stadium was completed in 1991. Gaelic sports have special requirements as they take place on a large field. A specific requirement was to ensure the spectators were not too far from the field of play. This resulted in the three-tier design from which viewing games is possible: the main concourse, a premium level incorporating hospitality facilities and an upper concourse. The premium level contains restaurants, bars and conference areas. The project was split into four phases over a 14-year period. Such was the importance of Croke Park to the GAA for hosting big games, the stadium did not close during redevelopment. During each phase different parts of the ground were redeveloped, while leaving the rest of the stadium open. Big games, including the annual All-Ireland Hurling and Football finals, were played in the stadium throughout the development.

Phase one – New Cusack Stand

The first phase of construction was to build a replacement for Croke Park's Cusack Stand. A lower deck opened for use in 1994. The upper deck opened in 1995. Completed at a cost of £35 million, the new stand is 180 metres long, 35 metres high, has a capacity for 27,000 people and contains 46 hospitality suites.  The new Cusack Stand contains three tiers from which viewing games is possible: the main concourse, a premium level incorporating hospitality facilities and finally an upper concourse. One end of the pitch was closer to the stand after this phase, as the process of slightly re-aligning the pitch during the redevelopment of the stadium began. The works were carried out by Sisk Group.

Phase two – Davin Stand
Phase Two of the development started in late 1998 and involved extending the new Cusack Stand to replace the existing Canal End terrace. It involved reacquiring a rugby pitch that had been sold to Belvedere College in 1910 by Frank Dineen. In payment and part exchange, the college was given the nearby Distillery Road sportsgrounds.
 
It is now known as The Davin Stand (Irish: Ardán Dáimhím), after Maurice Davin, the first president of the GAA. This phase also saw the creation of a tunnel which was later named the Ali tunnel in honour of Muhammad Ali and his fight against Al Lewis in July 1972 in Croke Park.

Phase three – Hogan Stand
Phase Three saw the building of the new Hogan Stand. This required a greater variety of spectator categories to be accommodated including general spectators, corporate patrons, VIPs, broadcast and media services and operation staff. Extras included a fitted-out mezzanine level for VIP and Ard Comhairle (Where the dignitaries sit) along with a top-level press media facility. The end of Phase Three took the total spectator capacity of Croke Park to 82,000.

The 1999 All-Ireland Senior Football Championship Final was the last to be held with the old Hogan Stand in place.

Phase four – Nally Stand & Nally End/Dineen Hill 16 terrace
After the 2003 Special Olympics, construction began in September 2003 on the final phase, Phase Four. This involved the redevelopment of the Nally Stand, named after the athlete Pat Nally, and Hill 16 into a new Nally End/Dineen Hill 16 terrace. While the name Nally had been used for the stand it replaced, the use of the name Dineen was new, and was in honour of Frank Dineen, who bought the original stadium for the GAA in 1908, giving it to them in 1913.   The old Nally Stand was taken away and reassembled in Pairc Colmcille, home of Carrickmore GAA in County Tyrone.

The phase four development was officially opened by the then GAA President Seán Kelly on 14 March 2005. For logistical reasons (and, to a degree, historical reasons), and also to provide cheaper high-capacity space, the area is a terrace rather than a seated stand, the only remaining standing-room in Croke Park. Unlike the previous Hill, the new terrace was divided into separate sections – Hill A (Cusack stand side), Hill B (behind the goals) and the Nally terrace (on the site of the old Nally Stand). The fully redeveloped Hill has a capacity of around 13,200, bringing the overall capacity of the stadium to 82,300. This made the stadium the second biggest in the EU after the Camp Nou, Barcelona. However, London's new Wembley stadium has since overtaken Croke Park in second place. The presence of terracing meant that for the brief period when Croke Park hosted international association football during 2007–2009, the capacity was reduced to approximately 73,500, due to FIFA's statutes stating that competitive games must be played in all-seater stadiums.

Pitch

The pitch in Croke Park is a soil pitch that replaced the Desso GrassMaster pitch laid in 2002. This replacement was made after several complaints by players and managers that the pitch was excessively hard and far too slippery.

Since January 2006, a special growth and lighting system called the SGL Concept has been used to assist grass growing conditions, even in the winter months. The system, created by Dutch company SGL (Stadium Grow Lighting), helps in controlling and managing all pitch growth factors, such as light, temperature, CO2, water, air and nutrients.

Floodlighting
With the 2007 Six Nations clash with France and possibly other matches in subsequent years requiring lighting the GAA installed floodlights in the stadium (after planning permission was granted). Indeed, many other GAA grounds around the country have started to erect floodlights as the organisation starts to hold games in the evenings, whereas traditionally major matches were played almost exclusively on Sunday afternoons. The first game to be played under these lights at Croke Park was a National Football League Division One match between Dublin and Tyrone on 3 February 2007 with Tyrone winning in front of a capacity crowd of over 81,000 – which remains a record attendance for a National League game, with Ireland's Six Nations match with France following on 11 February. Temporary floodlights were installed for the American Bowl game between Chicago Bears and Pittsburgh Steelers on the pitch in 1997, and again for the 2003 Special Olympics.

Concerts

Non-Gaelic games

There was great debate in Ireland regarding the use of Croke Park for sports other than those of the GAA. As the GAA was founded as a nationalist organisation to maintain and promote indigenous Irish sport, it has felt honour-bound throughout its history to oppose other, foreign (in practice, British), sports. In turn, nationalist groups supported the GAA as the prime example of purely Irish sporting culture.

Until its abolition in 1971, rule 27 of the GAA constitution stated that a member of the GAA could be banned from playing its games if found to be also playing association football, rugby or cricket. That rule was abolished but rule 42 still prohibited the use of GAA property for games with interests in conflict with the interests of the GAA. The belief was that rugby and association football were in competition with Gaelic football and hurling, and that if the GAA allowed these sports to use their ground it might be harmful to Gaelic games, while other sports, not seen as direct competitors with Gaelic football and hurling, were permitted, such as the two games of American football (Croke Park Classic college football game between The University of Central Florida and Penn State, and an American Bowl NFL preseason game between the Chicago Bears and the Pittsburgh Steelers) on the Croke Park pitch during the 1990s.

In June 2003, Croke Park served as the main venue for the 2003 Special Olympics World Summer Games with a noted highlight of the Special Olympics being Muhammad Ali attending the opening ceremony. They were the first edition of the Special Olympics World Summer Games not to be held in the United States.

On 16 April 2005, a motion to temporarily relax rule No. 42 was passed at the GAA Annual Congress. The motion gives the GAA Central Council the power to authorise the renting or leasing of Croke Park for events other than those controlled by the Association, during a period when Lansdowne Road – the venue for international soccer and rugby matches – was closed for redevelopment. The final result was 227 in favour of the motion to 97 against, 11 votes more than the required two-thirds majority.

In January 2006, it was announced that the GAA had reached agreement with the Football Association of Ireland (FAI) and Irish Rugby Football Union (IRFU) to stage two Six Nations games and four soccer internationals at Croke Park in 2007 and in February 2007, use of the pitch by the FAI and the IRFU in 2008 was also agreed. These agreements were within the temporary relaxation terms, as Lansdowne Road was still under redevelopment until 2010. Although the GAA had said that hosted use of Croke Park would not extend beyond 2008, irrespective of the redevelopment progress, fixtures for the 2009 Six Nations rugby tournament saw the Irish rugby team using Croke park for a third season. 11 February 2007 saw the first rugby union international to be played there. Ireland were leading France in a Six Nations clash, but lost 17–20 after conceding a last minute (converted) try. Raphaël Ibañez scored the first try in that match; Ronan O'Gara scored Ireland's first ever try at Croke Park.

A second match between Ireland and England on 24 February 2007 was politically symbolic because of the events of Bloody Sunday in 1920. There was considerable concern as to what reaction there would be to the singing of the British national anthem "God Save the Queen". Ultimately the anthem was sung without interruption or incident, and applauded by both sets of supporters at the match, which Ireland won by 43–13 (their largest ever win over England in rugby).

On 2 March 2010, Ireland played their final international rugby match against a Scotland team that was playing to avoid the wooden spoon and hadn't won a championship match against Ireland since 2001. Outside half, Dan Parks inspired the Scots to a 3-point victory and ended Irish Hopes of a triple crown.

On 24 March 2007, the first association football match took place at Croke Park. The Republic of Ireland took on Wales in UEFA Euro 2008 qualifying Group D, with a Stephen Ireland goal securing a 1–0 victory for the Irish in front of a crowd of 72,500. Prior to this, the IFA Cup had been played at the then Jones' Road in 1901, but this was 12 years before the GAA took ownership.

Negotiations took place for the NFL International Series's 2011 game to be held at Croke Park but the game was awarded to Wembley Stadium. In July 2013, it was announced that Penn State would open their 2014 college football season against Central Florida at Croke Park.

Croke Park was included as one of the stadiums in the Euro 2028 bid by England, Republic of Ireland, Scotland, Wales and Northern Ireland.

World record attendance
On 2 May 2009, Croke Park was the venue for a Heineken Cup rugby semi-final, in which Leinster defeated Munster 25–6. The attendance of 82,208 set a new world record attendance for a club rugby union game. This record stood until 31 March 2012 when it was surpassed by an English Premiership game between Harlequins and Saracens at Wembley Stadium which hosted a crowd of 83,761. This was beaten again in 2016 in the Top 14 final at the Nou Camp which hosted a crowd of 99,124

Skyline tour
A walkway, known under a sponsorship deal as Etihad Skyline Croke Park, opened on 1 June 2012. From 44 metres above the ground, it offers views of Dublin city and the surrounding area. The Olympic Torch was brought to the stadium and along the walkway on 6 June 2012.

GAA Hall of Fame

On 11 February 2013, the GAA opened the Hall of Fame section in the Croke Park museum. The foundation of the award scheme is the Teams of the Millennium the football team which was announced in 1999 and the hurling team in 2000 and all 30 players were inducted into the hall of fame along with Limerick hurler Éamonn Cregan and Offaly footballer Tony McTague who were chosen by a GAA sub-committee from the years 1970–74.
New inductees will be chosen on an annual basis from the succeeding five-year intervals as well as from years preceding 1970.
In April 2014, Kerry legend Mick O'Dwyer, Sligo footballer Micheál Kerins, along with hurlers Noel Skehan of Kilkenny and Pat McGrath of Waterford became the second group of former players to receive hall of fame awards.

National Handball Centre

The new National Handball Centre, located at the southeast corner of the stadium on Sackville Avenue, is close to completion, with the final minor stages of building delayed slightly due to the COVID-19 coronavirus pandemic. The new centre contains three 4-Wall handball courts - including a three sided glass wall show court with amphitheatre style seating for a capacity of 500 spectators, a Softball show court with seating capacity for 200 spectators and three 1-Wall courts as well as offices for GAA Handball staff, a bar and cafe as well as a community centre. The centre was used by Ireland's national health service, the Health Service Executive for COVID-19 testing during the COVID-19 pandemic. While the Centre's Official Opening has been delayed due to both the Covid-19 pandemic as well as the final completion of remaining building works, the Centre has had a 'soft' opening in Spring 2022, allowing registered players to book the courts through Croke Park. The official opening of the centre will be taking place in December 2022, coinciding with the first ever European 1-Wall Tour "EliteStop" taking place on Saturday 10th - Sunday 11th December 2022. It is expected the best One-wall handball/wallball players from around the world will be invited to attend. The event is being organised by the GAA in partnership with the European 1-Wall Tour and is expected to be livestreamed, with the finals broadcast live on Irish television.

See also
 Hill 16
 List of Gaelic Athletic Association stadiums
 List of stadiums in Ireland by capacity
 Sport in Ireland
 Camogie
 Gaelic football
 Hurling
 Gaelic handball
 International rules football
 Garth Brooks concerts controversy 2014

References

External links

 Official website

 
1913 establishments in Ireland
Gaelic games grounds in the Republic of Ireland
Ireland national rugby union team
Ireland, Republic of
Republic of Ireland national football team home stadiums
Sports venues in Dublin (city)
American Bowl venues
Sports venues completed in 1913
American football venues in the Republic of Ireland